There have been at least 182 confirmed tornadoes in the U.S. state of New Jersey since 1950. On average, there are three tornadoes each year in the state. They have occurred in every month but December and January. The state's most active year was 1989, when there were 19 confirmed tornadoes. Most tornadoes in New Jersey have been weak and short-lived. However, an F2 twister in 1958 crossed  of the southern portion of the state, the longest tracked event on record. It touched down in Camden County and ended in Ocean County. Ranked in intensity using the Fujita scale or Enhanced Fujita scale, there have been five F3 or EF3 twisters in the state since 1950, most recently in 2021. There have been at least three deadly tornadoes on record in the state, resulting in a collective 7 fatalities. A tornado in 1835 hit New Brunswick, killing five people. In 1941, a tornado in Gloucester County killed a person. In 2003, a tornado in Burlington County flung a tree limb onto three cars, killing one person.

Climatology
Each year, three tornadoes on average touch down in New Jersey, most of them weak and short-lived. There were 19 confirmed tornadoes in 1989, the most in a year since the start of recordkeeping in the National Centers for Environmental Information. Several years, most recently in 2018, had no recorded tornadoes in the state. There is a possible undercount in unpopulated areas in South Jersey, including around the New Jersey Pine Barrens and in Salem and Cumberland counties.

Tornadoes

Pre-1900
July 13, 1783 - 
July 24, 1803 - 
May 22, 1804 - A small tornado touched down in Flemington in Hunterdon County, which killed a person due to a falling tree. This marked the earliest recorded death in the state from a tornado. The tornado also touched down in Somerset and Middlesex counties.
June 19, 1835 (main article) - A tornado in New Brunswick killed five people. 
April 26, 1842 - 
August 22, 1843 - 
October 4, 1849  - 
July 5, 1850 - 
July 1, 1892: Gloucester County tornado
May 13, 1867 - 
July 29, 1875 - 
November 2, 1877 - 
August 3, 1885 - 
May 28, 1896 - 
June 30, 1892 - 
August 1, 1899: Union County tornado

1900s
March 27, 1911 - 
April 1, 1929 - 
August 15, 1941 - 
August 25, 1941 - A tornado in Gloucester County killed a person.
August 16, 1955 - An F2 or stronger tornado touched down in Monmouth County.
October 16, 1955 - 
May 6, 1956 - 
June 13, 1958 - There were three tornadoes in the state. An F2 tornado touched down in near Maple Shade in Camden County. It moved east across the state, until it eventually reached Barnegat Bay, where it became a waterspout. It crossed the bay and dissipated near Lavallette in Ocean County. Its  path made it the longest tracked tornado on record in the state.
July 14, 1960 - 
May 24, 1962 - 
July 15, 1970 - Bergen County
November 4, 1970 - Atlantic County
July 19, 1971: Bergen County
August 27, 1971: Cape May County
February 2, 1973 - Three tornadoes hit the state that day.
May 28, 1973 - Two F3 tornadoes struck Morris County. A dozen homes destroyed, and 12 people injured in Flanders, New Jersey. It was rated an F3.
April 14, 1974 - 
July 24, 1974: Ocean County
July 13, 1975: Bergen County
October 26, 1981 - 
 June 29, 1982: Ocean County
 July 21, 1983: Ocean County, an F3 tornado that caused no fatalities or injuries. 
July 21, 1987: Atlantic County 
July 26, 1987  - 
August 5, 1987: Atlantic County
August 17, 1988 - 
July 10, 1989: Northeastern United States tornado outbreak. Two F0s and an F1 tracked through parts of Passaic County, New Jersey and Bergen County, New Jersey, snapping and uprooting trees, and causing $4 million in damage. About 150 houses damaged in Bergen County alone.
November 15, 1989 - Part of a larger tornado outbreak
November 20, 1989 - 
May 10, 1990 - 
October 18, 1990: Montgomery Township tornado. Three homes destroyed, and 8 people injured in Montgomery Township, New Jersey. It was rated an F3. 
June 24, 1992: Washington Township, Morris County tornado
August 21, 1993 - 
July 3, 1994: Camden County
August 2, 1994: Burlington County
November 1, 1994: Monmouth County
May 29, 1995: Burlington County
July 16, 1995 - Two tornadoes struck down in the state, in Cape May County and Cumberland County.
October 21, 1995: Ocean County
The tornado damaged the roof of an apartment building, displacing 30 people. About 16,000 people lost power related to the event.
September 8, 1996 - An F0 tornado touched down in East Brunswick. It struck three nearby buildings, leaving 45 families homeless.
August 13, 1997 - An F0 tornado touched down in Middletown Township in Monmouth County, which remained on the ground for  before becoming a waterspout in Sandy Hook Bay.
It knocked down about 150 trees, two of which fell onto houses, and four of which fell onto cars.
September 2, 1998 - A line of thunderstorms spawned an F0 tornado in East Greenwich Township in Gloucester County, which downed a few trees, some of which fell onto homes. The tornado was on the ground for about  before lifting.
September 7, 1998 - A line of thunderstorms ahead of a cold front spawned two tornadoes in Union County. The tornado knocked down 95 trees and caused $1.5 million in damage. The tornado knocked down at least 150 trees along its  path, causing $550,000 in damage.
February 12, 1999 - An unseasonably warm air mass, in conjunction with a cold front, produced a line of thunderstorms that spawned an F1 tornado in Cherry Hill in Camden County. It damaged 13 homes, one of them severely, and a porch was destroyed. Damage was estimated at $100,000.
The F2 tornado damaged about 35 buildings, including two homes and a motel that were condemned. Damage was estimated at $4.2 million. One person was injured by flying glass. The tornado knocked down two transmission lines, leaving about 3,100 buildings without power. Moving over water, the tornado became a waterspout again, sinking a boat in Little Egg Harbor before dissipating.

2000s–present
May 27, 2001 - An F2 tornado touched down in Manalapan Township in Monmouth County, which caused about $1 million worth of damage.
It crossed the Garden State Parkway and later moved into Linwood. The tornado damaged six homes, left 400 people without power, and bent about 30 trees. Damage was estimated at $15,000.
July 3, 2003 - An F0 tornado touched down briefly in Goshen in Cape May County.
September 23, 2003 - Three tornadoes struck the state that day, one each in Mercer County, Hunterdon County, and Burlington County
October 27, 2003 - A strong cold front spawned three F0 tornados in the state. One touched down in Bedminster Township in Somerset County. It knocked down a few trees while it was briefly on the ground. Another touched down in Hainesport Township in Burlington County, the first recorded tornado in Burlington County since the 1700s. The last tornado of the day touched down along the Raritan River near Highland Park in Middlesex County. Only on the ground briefly, the tornado damaged a boat and a few trees.
July 27, 2004 - A high end F1 tornado touched down in Pemberton Township and continued into Woodland Township in Burlington County. A roof was peeled off and the top floor of a building was damaged at the New Lisbon Developmental Center. Two workers in separate vans received minor injuries when one van was overturned and the other hit by a tree branch.
July 29, 2009 - An EF2 tornado touched down near Wantage Township in Sussex County, downing numerous trees, partially collapsing two barns and damaging several others.
September 16, 2010 - An EF1 tornado touched down in Plumsted Township, causing roof damage to two homes and downing numerous trees.
August 9, 2011 - A brief EF0 tornado touched down in Millstone Township, and dissipated shortly after. No damage was reported.
August 28, 2011 - An EF0 tornado touched down near Robbinsville in Mercer County. Numerous trees were felled, and several electric poles were damaged.
September 4, 2012 - An EF0 touched down in Mount Ephraim, only being on the ground for less than a minute. The tornado uprooted trees, downed power lines and damaged the roofs of several homes.
July 1, 2013 - An EF0 tornado touched down in Berkeley Heights near the Passaic River just west of Garfield Street, passed northeast through New Providence and dissipated in Summit near Evergreen Road. The tornado caused extensive tree damage.
August 13, 2013 - An EF0 tornado touched down in Manahawkin, snapping trees, downing power lines and damaging several church buildings.
October 7, 2013 - An EF1 tornado touched down near the town of Paramus, moving northeast across Bergen County. The tornado damaged a cemetery and a golf course, and snapped and uprooted trees.
July 14, 2016 - An EF0 tornado touched down near White Township in Warren County and moved along a path nearly 3 miles long, damaging a barn and a home, and shearing the tops of trees.
July 25, 2016 - An EF1 tornado touched down in Readington Township in Hunterdon County and then moved east towards Somerset County. The tornado (thought at first to be a microburst) broke several utility poles, threw vehicles up to 100 feet in the air, and downed trees and power lines. It later moved into Branchburg.
June 24, 2017 - The remnants of Tropical Storm Cindy spawned two EF0 tornadoes within six minutes of each other in Howell Township in Monmouth County. The first touched down in a Home Depot parking lot, and damaged two buildings and several trees. The other tornado moved through Oak Glen Park, uprooting numerous hardwood trees before dissipating.
May 28, 2019 - An EF1 tornado touched down in Stanhope and damaged the Lenape Valley Regional High school. Several trees were snapped or uprooted in this area. A small but anchored outbuilding was also lifted and flipped over. Further tree damage occurred at a residence across the street from the school. Damage then appeared to briefly abate, indicating the tornado likely lifted for a short time. However, a short distance further southeast, additional tornadic damage was observed with numerous trees snapped or uprooted and several homes and cars sustaining damage from falling trees on and around Unger Avenue. The tornado dissipated shortly afterwards.
June 13, 2019 - A warm front spawned a line of thunderstorms, which spawned an EF0 tornado near Mullica Hill in Gloucester County; it damaged two properties while it was briefly on the ground. The tornado damaged four properties and uprooted several trees.
July 6, 2019 - A landspout briefly touched down as an EF0 tornado in Mount Laurel. It overturned a car before passing over a warehouse, causing minor roof damage.
July 11, 2019 - An EF1 tornado touched down in an open area on a golf course in Mount Laurel, travelling discontinuously for more than a mile, snapping and uprooting numerous trees, and damaging several apartment buildings before dissipating.
August 7, 2019 - A cold front spawned three tornadoes in the state. An EF0 touched down in Springfield Township in Union County, downing power lines, busting solar panels and damaging dozens of vehicles at a dealership. A rooftop air conditioning unit collapsed onto a sedan, and a section of the dealership's warehouse roof was torn wide open. An EF0 briefly touched down in Hightstown, which shattered the glass roof of a greenhouse. Flying glass injured a woman. The third was an EF0 in Millville in Cumberland County. It touched down briefly in a field of solar panels near the Millville City Sewer Department Facility, destroying several rows of panels. The tornado then moved into a wooded area, snapping at least one tree and damaging several others.
October 31, 2019 - A squall line spawned an EF1 tornado in Harding Township in Morris County. It knocked down several trees and power lines, some of which fell onto houses.
April 21, 2020 - A waterspout formed over Barnegat Bay between Silver Bay and Kettle Creek, then moved ashore in Normandy Beach as an EF0 tornado. Several boats and associated trailers were tossed and flipped, and one house was damaged. The tornado then became a waterspout as it emerged over the coastal waters, causing little or no additional damage.
August 4, 2020 - Tropical Storm Isaias moved through the state and spawned two tornadoes. The first was a waterspout that came ashore near the end of Corson's Inlet State Park near Strathmere in Cape May County. After moving through marshy areas, the EF1 tornado crossed the Garden State Parkway, and proceeded to damage several homes, as well as a Coca Cola facility, in Marmora. Another waterspout developed in Manahawkin Bay between Ship Bottom and Brant Beach, which moved northwestward, crossing the Route 72 bridge. The tornado tracked right over the Long Beach Island Weatherflow weather station located north of Egg Island and west of Flat Island in Manahawkin Bay, which measured a  wind gust, indicating it was an EF1 tornado. The tornado lifted shortly thereafter.
August 19, 2020 - An EF0 tornado touched down in an athletic field on the campus of Brookdale Community College in the Lincroft section of Middletown, which damaged a few trees.
July 9, 2021 - Tropical Storm Elsa moved along the New Jersey coast, and it spawned two tornadoes in the state that day. It destroyed the picnic shelter of a condonminium complex, and knocked down several trees, one into a house. In Little Egg Harbor in Ocean County, an EF0 tornado downed a few trees or limbs and damaged a few homes.
July 17, 2021 - An EF1 tornado touched down in Mansfield Township in Burlington County just east of the Route 206 and Columbus-Jobstown road intersection. Additionally, numerous tree limbs were blown on powerlines on Monmouth Road near Tilighmans corner. Afterwards, the tornado dissipated before the Ocean County line.
July 29, 2021 - As part of a larger tornado outbreak, a warm front spawned six tornadoes in the state that day. A short-lived EF0 tornado touched down in Verona inside the Montclair Golf Club, which downed a few trees, one of which fell onto a home. An EF2 tornado began in New Hope, Pennsylvania, which crossed the Delaware River and entered Mercer County, New Jersey near Washington Crossing; it knocked down hundreds of trees before lifting near Trenton Mercer Airport. An EF1 touched down on Route 130 south of Windsor near the Assunpink Creek, which damaged trees and one building. Another EF1 tornado touched down in a heavily forested area in eastern Woodland Township, which knocked down several trees and limbs along its path. An EF0 tornado touched down Jackson Township, damaging several trees near Success Lake. The same thunderstorm produced a tornado that touched down on the western coast of Barnegat Bay, which crossed the bay and struck Barnegat Light as an EF2; there, it damaged several houses and boats.
August 19, 2021 - The remnants of Tropical Storm Fred spawned an EF0 tornado in Rockaway Township in Morris County. It knocked down a few trees and branches, before crossing Interstate 80 and lifting.
September 1, 2021 - The remnants of Hurricane Ida spawned three tornadoes. An EF3 tornado touched down near Harrisonville in Gloucester County, which caused widespread damage in and around the Mullica Hill area. The same supercell produced an EF1 tornado in Burlington in Burlington County, which knocked down at least 30 trees, one of which fell onto a car. The tornado crossed the Delaware River and lifted in Bristol, Pennsylvania. The supercell later produced an EF0 tornado in Princeton, New Jersey, which downed a few trees in a parking lot.
May 20, 2022 - An EF0 tornado formed in Monmouth County just after 5 PM along Line Road on the borders of Aberdeen and Hazlet before continuing easterly into a residential neighborhood between Sophia Drive and Carlow Way. It was on the ground for approximately one minute. One home sustained structural damage after a tree fell onto its roof, and other houses lost siding, roof shingles or gutters. Fences, utility poles, and power lines were also damaged. The tornado dissipated several blocks after crossing the Garden State Parkway.

June 9, 2022, - An EF1 tornado occurred in Blackwood, NJ at 4:59 AM, lasting approximately two minutes, damaging multiple homes and uprooting at least three trees.
February 21, 2023 - NWS Mount Holly reported a radar-indicated tornado in the Hamilton Square, Twin Rivers, and Hightstown areas of Mercer County. NWS survey teams confirmed an EF2 tornado occurred at 3:35 PM, lasting approximately six minutes, traveled approximately 6 miles with an approximate width of 200 yards, damaging multiple residences and properties in Lawrence Township and West Windsor.

See also
List of New Jersey hurricanes

References

External links
Here’s every tornado that hit N.J. over 50 years, including 5 twisters in 2019 - NJ.com
N.J. Tornadoes 1980-1989

 
Lists of tornadoes in the United States
Tornadoes